Hagåtña (formerly in English: Agana , in Spanish: Agaña) is the capital village of the United States territory of Guam. From the 18th through mid-20th century, it was Guam's population center, but today it is the second smallest of the island's 19 villages in both area and population. However, it remains one of the island's major commercial districts in addition to being the seat of government.

Etymology
"Hagåt" (also romanized as haga, with a glottal stop instead of a syllable-final "t") means "blood" in the Chamorro language. The suffix "-ña" can be translated as either the possessive pronouns his, hers or its in English (cognate to -nya in Malay), or a signification of greater comparative degree, similar to some uses of the English suffix "-er". There is much speculation that the indigenous peoples originally migrated from the village of Agat/Hagåt. Therefore, "Hagåtña" can be translated "his or her blood" possibly meaning "related to him, her or it", or it could be translated to what might roughly mean "more Hagåt", as in, an extension of the village of Hagåt. It could also mean "better Hagåt", or "more than, surpassing or superior to Hagåt" in a sense of being "more Hagåt than Hagåt itself". In 1998, the Guam Legislature changed the name from "Agana" back to the original Chamorro/Chamoru form. However, the name of the neighboring village Agana Heights remains unchanged.

 Geography 
Hagåtña is located at the mouth of the Hagåtña River on Guam's west coast.  According to the United States Census Bureau, the city has a total area of 1 square mile (2.6 km²). It is (by direction of travel) the westernmost state or territorial capital city of the United States. The village is bounded by the sandy beaches of Agana Bay to the north, the Hagåtña River and associated wetlands to the east, and a cliff (above which is the village of Agana Heights) to the South.  Several high-rise office buildings are in the center of the village, while the western portion of the city known as Anigua is more residential.  Unlike many villages, central Hagåtña is divided into city blocks with shops and small restaurants throughout the center of the village.  Highly populated residential areas in the villages of Mongmong-Toto-Maite, Sinajana, and Agana Heights surround Hagåtña.

 Climate 
The city has a tropical rainforest climate (Köppen: Af) similar to that found in the Amazon Basin. The only time Hagåtña got snow was when a cold front from the Philippines reached Guam.

 History 

Hagåtña was a prominent village before Guam's colonization by the Spanish. In 1668, the first Spanish missionary, Padre San Vitores arrived on the island. The family of Chief Kepuha donated land in Hagåtña enabling San Vitores to build the first church (Dulce Nombre de Maria Cathedral-Basilica) on Guam.

Under Spanish rule, and particularly the Spanish-Chamorro Wars, much of the indigenous population of Guam and other Mariana Islands was forced to relocate to the city. The remains of buildings from the Spanish administration can be seen in the Plaza de España located beside the cathedral of the Archdiocese of Agana. The remains of the Spanish Governor's Palace is here and is closer to the Department of Education than the Cathedral.

After Guam was ceded by Spain to the United States in the Spanish–American War of 1898, 'Agana' remained the seat of government under U.S. Naval Administration. By 1940, the city's population had grown to about 10,000 containing nearly half of the island's residents. Villages had been established nearby for immigrants from the Caroline Islands.

Guam was captured by Japanese forces on December 8, 1941. The Japanese, renamed Guam Ōmiya-jima (ja.: 大宮島) or Great Shrine Island, and Agana Akashi''' (ja.: 明石) or Bright Stone''. During Guam's 1944 liberation from the Japanese during World War II, the city was heavily damaged by U.S. naval bombardment. Many former residents settled in other parts of Guam after the war. As part of Guam's reconstruction plan, the U.S. Navy constructed new straight city streets that passed through existing lots and created many plots of land with multiple owners. This has hindered the development of the city to the present day. In December 1944 Guam was the scene of the Agana race riot, between black and white servicemen stationed on the island.

Today, despite a resident population of about 1,000 (less than 1% of Guam's total), the city remains the seat of the territorial government. Its historic sites are major attractions for visitors. Hagåtña is served by Antonio B. Won Pat International Airport in Tamuning and Barrigada.

Culture
As Guam's historic population and administrative center, many traditional celebrations take place in Hagåtña.  On December 8, Santa Marian Kamalen, Patroness of the Mariana Islands, is honored with a procession in which a statue of the patroness is pulled on a cart amid the prayers of thousands of the island's Catholics. Guam's most celebrated patriotic holiday, Liberation Day, is on July 21.  The annual Liberation Day Parade takes place on Marine Corps Drive in Hagåtña.  In addition to the historic sites at the Plaza de España and the Basilica, Latte Stone Park and the Chamorro Village shopping area offer further information about the island's history and culture.

Demographics

The U.S. Census Bureau has the municipality a single census-designated place.

Infrastructure and government
The island's capital, the legislature, the governor's office and other government offices are in Hagåtña.  The Government House, traditionally the governor's official residence, is situated above the cliff but technically within the city limit of Hagåtña. Adelup Point is the home of the Ricardo J. Bordallo Governor's Complex. 

The Guam Department of Corrections operates the Hagåtña Detention Facility in Hagåtña.

Notable federal government agencies in Hagåtña include the District Court of Guam at 520 West Soledad Avenue, the United States Attorney at Sirena Plaza, 108 Hernan Cortez, Suite 500, and the United States Postal Service Post Office at 223 West Chalan Santo Papa.

Twin towns and sister cities

Hagåtña is twinned with:
 Guadalajara, Jalisco, Mexico
 Quezon City, Philippines, since October 2000
 Malolos, Bulacan, Philippines
 Legazpi, Albay, Philippines

Education

Primary and secondary schools

Public schools
The Guam Department of Education serves the entire island of Guam.

Hagåtña residents are zoned to:
Carlos L. Taitano Elementary School (Sinajana)
Jose L. G. Rios Middle School (Piti)
John F. Kennedy High School (Tamuning)

Private schools
Private schools in Hagåtña include:
Academy of Our Lady of Guam (Catholic girls' high school in Hagåtña)
Harvest Christian Academy (Christian school in Mong Mong Toto Maite)

Public libraries
The Guam Public Library System operates the Nieves M. Flores Memorial Library at 254 Martyr Street in Hagåtña.

Sites of interest

Gregorio D. Perez Marina (formerly, Agana Boat Basin)
Agana Shopping Center
Chamorro Village
Chief Quipuha Park
Dulce Nombre de Maria Cathedral Basilica
Fort Santa Agueda
Guam Congress Building
Guam Museum
Latte Stone Park
Paseo Stadium
Plaza de España
Ricardo J. Bordallo Governor's Complex
San Antonio Bridge (Tollai Achote)
Sirena Park

Notable people
 Sian Proctor, commercial astronaut
 Jason Cunliffe, Guam international footballer.
 Ann Curry, journalist. Born in Agaña.
 Venancio Roberto, two-day Governor of Guam.
 Kimberley Santos, Miss World 1980 (succeeded).
 Frank Camacho, mixed martial artist

Government

References

Rogers, Robert F (1995). Destiny's Landfall: A History of Guam: University of Hawai'i Press. 
Carter, Lee D; Carter, Rosa Roberto; Wuerch, William L (1997). Guam History: Perspectives Volume One: MARC. 
Sanchez, Pedro C. Guahan, Guam: The History of our Island: Sanchez Publishing House.
(1996) Kinalamten Pulitikat: Sinenten I Chamorro: Issues in Guam's Political Development: The Chamorro Perspective: The Political Status Education Coordinating Commission.

External links

Guampedia, Guam's Online Encyclopedia Hagåtña Village
Hagåtña Guam at Guam Portal
City of Hagåtña – Government of Guam
Virtual Hagåtña

 
Villages in Guam
Capitals in Oceania
Capitals of political divisions in the United States